Pyrpotyra is a genus of beetles in the family Cerambycidae, containing the following species:

 Pyrpotyra albitarsis (Galileo & Martins, 2010)
 Pyrpotyra capixaba Santos-Silva, Martins & Clarke, 2010
 Pyrpotyra paradisiaca (Tippmann, 1953)
 Pyrpotyra paraensis Santos-Silva, Martins & Clarke, 2010
 Pyrpotyra pytinga Santos-Silva, Martins & Clarke, 2010

References

Rhinotragini